Henry P. Coburn Public School No. 66 is a historic elementary school building located at Indianapolis, Marion County, Indiana.  It was built in 1915, and is a two-story, rectangular, Mediterranean Revival style brown brick building on a raised basement. It has limestone coping and buff terra cotta trim.  An addition was constructed in 1929.

It was added to the National Register of Historic Places in 1986.

References

Elementary schools in Indiana
School buildings on the National Register of Historic Places in Indiana
Renaissance Revival architecture in Indiana
School buildings completed in 1915
Schools in Indianapolis
National Register of Historic Places in Indianapolis
1915 establishments in Indiana